The Best of Dave Mason is the name of two albums by Dave Mason, including:

The Best of Dave Mason (1974 album)
The Best of Dave Mason (1981 album)